Remember Me: The Mahalia Jackson Story is an American biographical musical drama film directed by Denise Dowse (in her directing debut) and written by Ericka Nicole Malone. The film stars Ledisi as gospel singer and activist Mahalia Jackson. Also starring Columbus Short, Wendy Raquel Robinson, Janet Hubert, Vanessa Williams, Corbin Bleu and Keith David. It premiered at the 2022 Pan African Film & Arts Festival in Los Angeles in April 2022. The film later premiered on Hulu on September 20, 2022.

The film received three NAACP Image Awards nomination at the 54th NAACP Image Awards: for Outstanding Independent Motion Picture, Outstanding Breakthrough Performance in a Motion Picture (Ledisi), and Outstanding Breakthrough Creative (Motion Picture) (Ericka Nicole Malone).

Cast
Ledisi as Mahalia Jackson
Columbus Short as Martin Luther King Jr.
 Wendy Raquel Robinson as Cylestine
 Janet Hubert as Aunt Duke
 Vanessa Williams as Lucille 
Corbin Bleu as Cab Calloway
Keith David as Ink Williams

Production
The film was announced in January 2021 with casting Ledisi as Jackson , Columbus Short as Martin Luther King Jr., Janet Hubert and Wendy Raquel Robinson. It the second time Ledisi playing Mahalia Jackson, first was in the 2014 film Selma.

References

External links

2022 biographical drama films
2020s English-language films
2022 films
American biographical drama films
Civil rights movement in film
Films about activists
2020s American films